Joachim Hossenfelder (29 April 1899, Cottbus – 28 June 1976, Lübeck) was a German Protestant theologian.

Works 
 Die Richtlinien der deutschen Christen. ed. Joachim Hossenfelder. Berlin 1932
 Unser Kampf (= Schriftenreihe der „Deutschen Christen“. Heft 1). M. Grevemeyer, Berlin-Charlottenburg 1933, ; 2nd ed. Gesellschaft für Zeitungsdienst, Berlin; H. G. Wallmann, Leipzig 1933
 Volk und Kirche. Die amtlichen Berichte der ersten Reichstagung 1933 der Glaubensbewegung „Deutsche Christen“ (= Schriftenreihe der „Deutschen Christen“. Heft 4). Berlin, 1933,  (Tagungsband); 2nd & 3rd eds. Grevemeyer, Berlin-Charlottenburg 1933.

References

Further reading 
 Klaus Scholder: Die Kirchen und das Dritte Reich. Band 1: Vorgeschichte und Zeit der Illusion 1918–1934. Econ-Ullstein-List, München 2000, ISBN 3-612-26730-2.
 Joachim G. Vehse: Leben und Wirken des ersten Reichsleiters der Deutschen Christen, Joachim Hossenfelder. In: Schriften des Vereins für Schleswig-Holsteinische Kirchengeschichte. 2. Reihe: Beiträge und Mitteilungen, Band 38. Karl Wachholtz, Neumünster 1982, S. 73–123.

External links 
Works on and by Joachim Hossenfelder in the Deutschen Nationalbibliothek

1899 births
1976 deaths
People from Cottbus
People from the Province of Brandenburg
German Protestant theologians
Nazi Party members